The Cyclophile Aigle is a cyclo-cross race held in Aigle, Switzerland, which is part of the UCI Cyclo-cross World Cup.

Past winners

References
 Men's results
 Women's results

UCI Cyclo-cross World Cup
Cycle races in Switzerland
Cyclo-cross races
Recurring sporting events established in 1970
1970 establishments in Switzerland
Aigle